Sheikh Sultan bin Zayed bin Sultan Al Nahyan (1953 – 18 November 2019) was an Emirati politician and member of the Al Nahyan family who previously served as the 3rd Deputy Prime Minister of the United Arab Emirates.

Early life and education
Sheikh Sultan was the second son of Sheikh Zayed bin Sultan Al Nahyan, founder of the UAE. He was born in 1953. His mother was his father's second wife, Sheikha bint Madhad Al Mashghouni. Sheikh Sultan was educated at Millfield School in Somerset, England and was a graduate of Royal Military Academy Sandhurst. His older paternal half-brother Sheikh Khalifa, was the president of the United Arab Emirates (2004-2022), while his other half-brother, Sheikh Mohammed, is the current President of the United Arab Emirates and the Ruler of Abu Dhabi.

Career
Sheikh Sultan served as the Chairman of the UAE Football Association (1976–1981). In 1990, he was appointed as deputy prime minister of the United Arab Emirates

From 1997 to 2009 he served with his younger half-brother Sheikh Hamdan as deputy prime minister. In 2009, he was replaced by his half-brother Sheikh Saif and Sheikh Mansour in the post.

Sheikh Sultan was the president's representative, chairman of the media and cultural centre, chairman of the Emirates Heritage Club and chairman of Zayed center for coordination and follow-up, a member of Supreme Petroleum Council, and a member of Abu Dhabi Investment Authority.

Sheikh Sultan once served as the Chairman of the Zayed Center which was later closed by the UAE government when it became known that it disseminated and provided a platform for anti-American, anti-Semitic, and extreme anti-Israel views.

Death
Sultan bin Zayed died on 18 November 2019.

Ancestry

References

External links

1953 births
2019 deaths
Graduates of the Royal Military Academy Sandhurst
Emirati politicians
House of Al Nahyan
Deputy Prime Ministers of the United Arab Emirates
Government ministers of the United Arab Emirates
Children of presidents of the United Arab Emirates
Sons of monarchs
People educated at Millfield